Half Shot Shooters is a 1936 short subject directed by Preston Black starring American slapstick comedy team The Three Stooges (Moe Howard, Larry Fine and Curly Howard). It is the 14th entry in the series released by Columbia Pictures starring the comedians, who released 190 shorts for the studio between 1934 and 1959.

Plot
The film opens in 1918, where, upon receiving medals for "wounds in action" (being beaten up by their sergeant after sleeping through an attack), the Three Stooges are discharged from the army immediately following the end of World War I; they subsequently take revenge on Sgt. MacGillicuddy (Stanley Blystone) in retribution for his attack and overall poor treatment of them.

The film then cuts to 1935. The Stooges are traveling the streets hungry and are tricked into signing up for the army again. Unfortunately for them, MacGillicuddy is again the sergeant in charge. In the office of their colonel at the army base they have been sent to, the still-hungry Stooges fall upon some tomatoes MacGillicuddy had brought in. He orders them to throw away the tomatoes, and, demonstrating, throws one away himself, inadvertently hitting the colonel. As punishment, MacGillicuddy is ordered to polish spittoons.

Moe, Larry, and Curly are then assigned to coast artillery, and begin practicing their "skills". They first hit a smokestack, followed by a house, a bridge, and lastly, a battleship, which just happens to be the flagship of a navy admiral. Sgt. MacGillicuddy and a group of officers rush up to investigate; when they question the Stooges as to whom is responsible for hitting the admiral's flagship, Moe and Larry hit, slap and kick Curly for shooting the wrong target. The vengeful sergeant asks them to line up for a photo shoot. The Stooges agree, glad to be rewarded for their sharp shooting, and pose as Sgt. MacGillicuddy swings a deck gun at them and fires, leaving three pairs of smoking boots behind.

Production notes
Half Shot Shooters was filmed on March 18–21, 1936. The film's title is a pun on Half Shot at Sunrise (1930), an RKO Radio Pictures movie with Wheeler & Woolsey.

This film marked the inaugural appearance of Vernon Dent, who appeared in more Stooge shorts than any other supporting actor. It also marked the final appearance of the old Columbia Pictures logo of a woman bearing a torch during the credits.

Unusually for one of their films, the Three Stooges are killed at the end of Half Shot Shooters. This plot device was used sporadically through their films, also being implemented in 1939's Three Little Sew and Sews, You Nazty Spy! and I'll Never Heil Again among others.

Dick Wessel had a minor role as a gunnery soldier but made his first appearance as a character in 1947's Fright Night (Shemp Howard's return).

Half-Shot Shooters has been criticized for its sadistic violence executed against the Stooges, with MacGillicuddy breaking Moe's arm, deafening all three, and then killing them at the conclusion.

Quotes
Officer: "Where were you born?!"
Curly: (unable to hear him) "He says your pants are torn!"
Moe: "I ain't got any horn!"
Larry: "No, not warn! Corn!"
Curly: "What?"
Larry: "CORN!"
Curly: "Oh, corn! I got two on both dogs!" (to the officer) "Can you tell where I can get a corn plaster, shorty?"
Officer: "Were you born in this country?"
Larry: "What?"
Officer: "Were you born in this country?!"
Larry: "No, Milwaukee."
Officer: "Would you fight for this great republic and-"
Moe: "Republican? Naw, I'm a Democrat!"
Curly: "Not me! I'm a pedestrian."

References

External links
 
 
Half Shot Shooters at threestooges.net

1936 films
1936 comedy films
The Three Stooges films
American black-and-white films
Military humor in film
Western Front (World War I) films
Columbia Pictures short films
American slapstick comedy films
1930s English-language films
1930s American films